Nouvelle Vague may refer to:

 French New Wave
 Japanese New Wave
 Nouvelle Vague (band)
 Nouvelle Vague (album)
 Nouvelle Vague (film)

See also 
 New Wave (disambiguation)